The 2001 elections to Shropshire County Council took place on 7 June 2001.

The Labour party increased its number of councillors at the expense of the Conservatives and Liberal Democrats. The council remained no overall control however.

No boundary changes had occurred since the 1997 elections.

Results

|}

References

2001
2001 English local elections
21st century in Shropshire
June 2001 events in the United Kingdom